Md. Amjad Hossain Talukdar is a Bangladesh Awami League politician and a former Jatiya Sangsad member from the Kurigram-3 constituency.

Career
Talukdar was elected to parliament from Kurigram-3 as a Bangladesh Awami League candidate in 1991.

References

Living people
Awami League politicians
5th Jatiya Sangsad members
Year of birth missing (living people)
Place of birth missing (living people)